The 1991 Hardee's 500 was the 29th and final stock car race of the 1991 NASCAR Winston Cup Series and the 32nd iteration of the event. The race was held on Sunday, November 17, 1991, before an audience of 125,000 in Hampton, Georgia, at Atlanta Motor Speedway, a  permanent asphalt quad-oval intermediate speedway. The race took the scheduled 328 laps to complete. At race's end, Roush Racing driver Mark Martin would manage to dominate the majority of the race to take his fifth career NASCAR Winston Cup Series victory and his only victory of the season.

By starting the race, Richard Childress Racing driver Dale Earnhardt would clinch his fifth NASCAR Winston Cup Series championship. With the championship, he was two championships away from tying Richard Petty for the record of the most NASCAR Winston Cup Series championships, with Petty having seven.

Background 

Atlanta Motor Speedway (formerly Atlanta International Raceway) is a 1.522-mile race track in Hampton, Georgia, United States, 20 miles (32 km) south of Atlanta. It has annually hosted NASCAR Winston Cup Series stock car races since its inauguration in 1960.

The venue was bought by Speedway Motorsports in 1990. In 1994, 46 condominiums were built over the northeastern side of the track. In 1997, to standardize the track with Speedway Motorsports' other two intermediate ovals, the entire track was almost completely rebuilt. The project made the track one of the fastest on the NASCAR circuit.

Entry list 

 (R) - denotes rookie driver.

Qualifying 
Qualifying was split into two rounds. The first round was held on Friday, November 15, at 2:00 PM EST. Each driver would have one lap to set a time. During the first round, the top 20 drivers in the round would be guaranteed a starting spot in the race. If a driver was not able to guarantee a spot in the first round, they had the option to scrub their time from the first round and try and run a faster lap time in a second round qualifying run, held on Saturday, November 16, at 10:30 AM EST. As with the first round, each driver would have one lap to set a time. For this specific race, positions 21-40 would be decided on time, and depending on who needed it, a select amount of positions were given to cars who had not otherwise qualified but were high enough in owner's points; up to two were given.  If needed, a past champion who did not qualify on either time or provisionals could use a champion's provisional, adding one more spot to the field.

Five drivers would fail to qualify.

Full qualifying results

Race results

Standings after the race 

Drivers' Championship standings

Note: Only the first 10 positions are included for the driver standings.

References 

1991 NASCAR Winston Cup Series
NASCAR races at Atlanta Motor Speedway
November 1991 sports events in the United States
1991 in sports in Georgia (U.S. state)